Dr. Herbert Gastineau Earle (10 August 1882 – 5 June 1946) was an English physiologist.

Publications
 Basal Metabolism with Special Reference to Chinese Students (1923)
 An Imperial Policy in Education (1926)
 Report on the Lester Trust, Shanghai (1927)
 Basal Metabolism of Chinese and Westerners (1928)

References

1882 births
1946 deaths
Academic staff of the University of Hong Kong
Alumni of Downing College, Cambridge
British expatriates in China
British expatriates in Hong Kong
World War II civilian prisoners held by Japan
English physiologists
Hong Kong medical doctors
People educated at the City of London School